Catalepsy is an American deathcore band formed in 2004. They have released one EP, Godless, and three studio albums, Iniquity, Bleed and Abomination of Desolation.

History
Catalepsy was founded in 2004 as a thrash/metalcore three-piece. From August 2006 the band's sound moved towards deathcore. They entered the studio in September and recorded two demo songs. In 2008, the band finished a tour with Hatebreed for their Live Dominance DVD release. They completed their first studio album, Iniquity, in January 2008. The album was released on May 13, 2008. In early 2008, the band recorded a music video for their song "Trust". It premiered on MTV's Headbangers Ball. In late 2008, Drew Carothers left the band  and was replaced by Josh Anderson of the Florida band Iamdivide. The band continued to tour with bands including After the Burial, Oceano, Too Pure to Die, Waking the Cadaver and Rose Funeral.

In October 2010, during the recording of Bleed, Josh Anderson left the band. He was replaced by Rick Norman, formerly of In The Ruins, also a past member of Catalepsy. On December 3, 2010, the band released the first single from Bleed called "Infernal". On February 26, 2011, the band announced a music video for the track "Bleed" due in the album release of May 10, 2011. Bleed was released on May 10, 2011 through Eulogy Recordings.

In late 2011, vocalist Rick Norman left the band and Josh Anderson returned in his place. On December 28, 2011, the band released a song titled "Westboro" that thematised the Westboro Baptist Church.

Catalepsy disbanded in 2013 but re-formed in September 2014 shortly. Catalepsy were writing new material in 2021 for an upcoming single, featuring all original members from the beginning of the band’s formation.

Members
Current lineup
Ben Sutton – drums (2007–2008, 2010–2012, 2014–present)
Rob Walden - guitar (2004-2013, 2021–present)
Andrew Carothers – vocals (2007–2008, 2010, 2014–present)

Past lineup
Pat – bass
Jeff Sanchez – bass
Craig O'Reilly III – bass
Timothy Smith – bass
Justin Grimes – drums
Charles Nikolet – drums
Rob Walden – guitar (2004–2012)
Mat Selovers – guitar (2004–2005)
Benjamin Tucker – vocals (2004–2005)
Nancy Michelle – vocals (2005–2006)
Danny Schwartz – bass (2006–2011)
Mike Cromwell – guitar (2006–2007)
John Stephan – guitar (2007–2008)
Rob Conover – vocals (2008–2009)
Josh Anderson – vocals (2008–2010, 2011–2012)
Bert Conover – vocals (2009)
Mike Burns – drums (2010)
Brandon Honeycutt - bass (2010)
Rick Norman – vocals (2010–2011)
Sean Murphy – bass (2011–2012)
Matt Browning – guitar (2011–2012)

Discography
Albums
Iniquity (2008)
Bleed (2011)
Abomination of Desolation (2012)

EPs
Godless (2007)
Hallowed Be Thy Grave (2005)
Decapitation of Eros (2005)

Videography
"Trust" (2008)
"Bleed" (2011)

References

External links
 Official website

Eulogy Recordings artists
Heavy metal musical groups from Florida
Musical groups established in 2004
American deathcore musical groups
Musical groups disestablished in 2012
Musical groups reestablished in 2014